Nositi is a local newspaper published in Albania. The paper was started in 1998 and has its headquarters in Pogradec.

References

1998 establishments in Albania
Albanian-language newspapers
Newspapers published in Albania
Publications established in 1998
Pogradec